Clara Genevieve Kennedy was an American screenwriter and author active during Hollywood's silent era. She wrote most of her scripts for Paramount.

Biography 
Clara was born in Monteagle, Tennessee, to Frederick Kennedy and Clara Lane. Her sister was screenwriter Edith Kennedy. She married Rev. Ivan Melville Terwilliger in Los Angeles in 1922; the pair had two children. She died in Hanford, California, in 1982.

Selected filmography 

 Glass Houses (1922)
 Eyes of the Heart (1920)
 A City Sparrow (1920)
 Sick Abed (1920)
 The Dancin' Fool (1920)
 Double Speed (1920)
 You're Fired (1919)
 An Innocent Adventuress (1919)

References 

Screenwriters from Tennessee
American women screenwriters
1892 births
1982 deaths
People from Monteagle, Tennessee
20th-century American women writers
20th-century American screenwriters